Curtis John Langdon (born 3 August 1997) is an English professional rugby union player who plays at hooker. He recently played for Worcester Warriors in Premiership Rugby but his contract was terminated along with every other Warriors player on 5 October 2022.

Career
Langdon began playing rugby age 6 in Weston-super-mare at Hornets Rugby club and joined London Irish at 15.  On 10 August 2016 he left London Irish to join Sale Sharks. In September 2020 Langdon scored a try for the Sale side that defeated Harlequins in the final of the Premiership Rugby Cup.

Langdon scored for the England under-20  team against Italy in the 2016 Six Nations Under 20s Championship. In June 2021 he was selected by Eddie Jones for the senior England team and on 4 July 2021 made his debut against the United States at Twickenham.

References

1997 births
Living people
English rugby union players
England international rugby union players
Henley Hawks players
Sale Sharks players
Doncaster Knights players
Rugby union hookers
Rugby union players from Weston-Super-Mare
People educated at St Paul's School, London